Viscount of Audenaerde was a Flemish feudal title. It was associated successively with two families.

History 
The title was created by Maximilian of Austria around 1482, after the death of his wife Mary of Burgundy. He created the title as a mark of merit, with the privilege of hereditary rights. The title was given to Gaultier (Wouter) van Rechem, chatelain of the castle of Burgundy. The noble house of Rechem was from Kortrijk and possessed the dominium of Kerchove.

Viscounts of Audenaerde

References 

Viscounts of Belgium
Lalaing family
People from Oudenaarde